The Tri-City Atoms were a minor league baseball team located in Kennewick, Washington. The Tri-Cities in southeastern Washington, which include Kennewick, Richland, and Pasco, fielded a number of minor league teams in the Northwest League and its predecessor, the Western International League, from 1955 to 1974.

History
The Tri-City Braves were a member of the WIL from 1950 through 1954. In 1955 Tri-City joined the Northwest League as a charted member. The Tri-City Braves, while serving as an affiliate of various major league clubs retained the Braves name through 1960. Upon signing on with the Baltimore Orioles in 1961, the club adopted a unique name, the Atoms. The club reverted to Braves for 1962 season, which proved to be a successful year as team finished the regular season in first place. The Braves faced the Wenatchee Chiefs in the league championship, but lost the 2–4. In 1963 the team changed its name to Angels, representative of its parent club.

The franchise again changed affiliates, signing on with the Baltimore Orioles resulting in a name change to Atoms. Led by manager Cal Ripken Sr. the Atoms posted an 81–58 record in the clubs final season of full season baseball. The Atoms swept the Lewiston Broncs in the championship series 3–0 to claim their first Northwest League crown.

In 1966 the Northwest League shifted to a short-season format. Tri-City switched parent clubs and signed a player development contract with the Los Angeles Dodgers. The Atoms had an explosive season and finished the regular season at 57–27. The Atoms finished at the top of the league standings to be named league champion. Two seasons later the Atoms compiled a league best record en route to a third Northwest League title. The Dodgers ended their relationship with Tri-City following the 1968 season and moved their farm system to Medford, Oregon with the Rouge Valley club.

In 1969 Tri-City partnered with the Oakland Athletics, The affiliation would end after only one season as Oakland shifted their short-season. 
Tri-City inked a player development contract with the San Diego Padres, who were one year removed from their inaugural season as an expansion member of the National League.

In 1974, the Ports were an independent team and went 27–57 in front of 21,611 fans. The team was managed by owner Carl W. Thompson, Sr. before folding.

The Tri-Cities were without baseball until 1983, when the Tri-Cities Triplets relocated from Walla Walla. The Triplets were affiliated with the Texas Rangers for two seasons. The Rangers ended their relationship with the Triplets and the club played two season as an independent team.  Following the 1986 season the Triplets relocated to Boise, Idaho and became the Boise Hawks.

Professional baseball returned to the Tri-Cities in 2001 with relocation of the Portland Rockies, who were forced to move as the territory was awarded to a AAA level franchise. Originally the team planned to keep the Rockies name. Ultimately the club selected a unique moniker, the Dust Devils.

Ballpark
Tri-City teams played home games at Sanders-Jacobs Field in Kennewick, The ballpark was opened in 1950 with a seating capacity of 5,000 and a northeast alignment. The field dimensions were 340 feet from home plate down both the right and left field lines and 400 feet to dead center. Originally the stadium was named Sanders Field for Harry Sanders, a Connell farmer.
It was later named Sanders-Jacobs Field to honor Tom Jacobs, a former manager and the general manager of the Atoms. The stadium was demolished in 1975.

Notable players

Season-by-season record

Former players
Tri-City Padres players   (1970–1972)
Tri-City A's players   (1969)
Tri-City Atoms players   (1961, 1965–1968)
Tri-City Angels players   (1963–1964)
Tri-City Braves players   (1950–1960, 1962)

References

External links
Baseball Reference – Tri-Cities teams

Sports in the Tri-Cities, Washington
Professional baseball teams in Washington (state)
Pasco, Washington
Defunct Northwest League teams
Los Angeles Dodgers minor league affiliates
San Diego Padres minor league affiliates
Oakland Athletics minor league affiliates
Baltimore Orioles minor league affiliates
Los Angeles Angels minor league affiliates
Pittsburgh Pirates minor league affiliates
Philadelphia Phillies minor league affiliates
St. Louis Cardinals minor league affiliates
1950 establishments in Washington (state)
1986 disestablishments in Washington (state)
Baseball teams established in 1950
Sports clubs disestablished in 1986
Defunct baseball teams in Washington (state)